Elias Benjamin Sanford (1843-1932) was an American clergyman, notable for his role in helping create the Federal Council of Churches. A Methodist by training from his time at Wesleyan University, he spent the majority of his career preaching at Congregationalist churches in Connecticut.

References

Citations

Bibliography

1843 births
1932 deaths
Wesleyan University alumni